Miani D Shira  is an Indian politician from Meghalaya and a member of the All India Trinamool Congress. She was elected as a member of the Legislative Assembly of Meghalaya from Ampati in 2018 by election. Miani D Shira is the daughter of former Chief Minister of Meghalaya Mukul Sangma.

After completing her schooling from Shillong, she went to Sri Ram College of Commerce in New Delhi. In 2018, she contested the by-election in the Meghalaya Legislative Assembly for Ampati and defeated National People's Party's C. G. Momin. She is one of the youngest legislators in the Meghalaya Legislative Assembly. Her husband, Daryll William Cheran Momin is also a politician who has contested elections and is the grandson of Williamson A. Sangma.

References

Trinamool Congress politicians from Meghalaya
People from South West Garo Hills district
Living people
People from Imphal
Meghalaya MLAs 2018–2023
Year of birth missing (living people)
Garo people